Le Prolétaire normand ('The Norman Proletarian') was a communist weekly newspaper published from Sotteville-les-Rouen, France. The newspaper was published between 1933 and 1937. It had a local edition based in Le Havre.

On average, around 5,000 copies of Le Prolétaire normand were printed weekly. Most of them, 4,300-4,580, were sold by Communist Party cadres.

References

1933 establishments in France
1937 disestablishments in France
Communist newspapers
Defunct newspapers published in France
Defunct weekly newspapers
History of the French Communist Party
Mass media in Rouen
Publications established in 1933
Publications disestablished in 1937
Weekly newspapers published in France